Cultripalpa lunulifera is a species of moth of the family Erebidae.

Distribution
It is found in Malaysia, Singapore, Thailand and Indochina.

References

Erebidae
Calpinae
Moths described in 1926